Rediu is a commune in Iași County, Western Moldavia, Romania, part of the Iași metropolitan area. It is composed of four villages: Breazu, Horlești, Rediu and Tăutești.

References

Communes in Iași County
Localities in Western Moldavia